Eddington or Edington may refer to:

People 

Eddington Varmah, Liberian politician
Eddington (surname), people with the surname

Places

Australia 
 Eddington, Victoria

United Kingdom 
 Eddington, Berkshire
 Eddington, Cambridge
 Eddington, Kent
 Edington, Somerset
 Edington, Wiltshire
 Edington Priory

United States 
 Eddington, Maine
 Eddington, Pennsylvania
 Eddington (SEPTA station)

Other uses 
 Battle of Edington, decisive victory by Alfred the Great
 Eddington (horse), American thoroughbred racehorse

Named after Sir Arthur Eddington 
 Eddington (crater), on the Moon
 Eddington (spacecraft), a cancelled ESA mission to search for extrasolar planets
 Eddington luminosity or Eddington limit, relating to the maximum mass of a star
 Eddington Medal, awarded by the Royal Astronomical Society
 Eddington number, the number of protons in the observable universe
 Eddington–Dirac number, alternative name for the Dirac large numbers hypothesis
 Eddington–Finkelstein coordinates, in the theory of general relativity